The following is a list of county roads in Suwannee County, Florida.  All county roads are maintained by the county in which they reside.

County roads in Suwannee County

References

FDOT Map of Suwannee County, Florida
FDOT GIS data, accessed January 2014

 
County